Randy Duane Knorr (born November 12, 1968) is an American professional baseball player, coach, and manager. He is currently the catching coordinator for the Washington Nationals. Knorr is a former catcher in Major League Baseball who played for the Toronto Blue Jays (1991–95), Houston Astros (1996–97 and 1999), Florida Marlins (1998), Texas Rangers (2000) and Montreal Expos (2001).

Career

Playing career
He was on the Blue Jays during their 1991 American League Eastern Division and 1992 and 1993 World Series wins. He also helped the Astros win the 1997 and 1999 National League Central Division. During the Australian summer of 1989-90, Knorr played ball for the Melbourne Monarchs and the Williamstown Wolves.

In 11 seasons, Knorr played in 253 games and compiled a .226 batting average with 24 home runs and 88 RBI. Shortly before he retired, he played for the Edmonton Trappers. In July 2004, Knorr became a citizen of Canada. He played with the CARDENALES DE LARA BBC  in the venezuelan winter league in the 90-91 season being champions for the first time in the venezuelan league

Coaching career
In 2008, he was the manager of the Potomac Nationals, who he guided to the 2008 Carolina League Mills Cup championship on Sept. 12, 2008. He served as the bullpen coach for the Washington Nationals for the last half of the 2006 season and was hired to be the bullpen coach for a second time in 2009. He was promoted to bench coach in 2012, and served in that capacity under Davey Johnson and then Matt Williams, for 4 years.  Shortly after the 2015 season, Williams was fired as the manager, and Knorr was told that his contract would not be renewed; soon afterwards, Knorr returned to the Nationals organization as Senior Advisor to the General Manager for Player Development.

On October 23, 2017, Randy was named the manager of the Syracuse Chiefs, the Washington Nationals Triple-A affiliate. He previously managed the Chiefs in 2011.

On October 28, 2020, he was named first base coach for the Washington Nationals. On October 10, 2021, Knorr was removed from his position and assigned to a player development role.

References

External links
, or Retrosheet
Pelota Binaria (Venezuelan Winter League)

1968 births
Living people
American expatriate baseball players in Canada
Baseball coaches from California
Baseball players from California
Cardenales de Lara players
American expatriate baseball players in Venezuela
Charlotte Knights players
Dunedin Blue Jays players
Edmonton Trappers players
Florida Marlins players
Houston Astros players
Knoxville Blue Jays players
Major League Baseball bench coaches
Major League Baseball bullpen coaches
Major League Baseball catchers
Medicine Hat Blue Jays players
Montreal Expos players
Myrtle Beach Blue Jays players
Nashville Sounds players
New Orleans Zephyrs players
Oklahoma City RedHawks players
Ottawa Lynx players
Syracuse Chiefs managers
Texas Rangers players
Toronto Blue Jays players
Washington Nationals coaches
American expatriate baseball players in Australia